Eduardo Siaboc Jr. (born January 21, 1987), also known as his stage name Jay-R Siaboc, is a Filipino actor, singer, host and model. He started as a student of Pinoy Dream Academy and became a first runner-up next to the grand star dreamer Yeng Constantino.

Early life
Eduardo Siaboc Jr. was born on January 21, 1987, where he was raised by his father Eduardo Siaboc Sr. The youngest of five siblings, Siaboc grew up having not much. He was forced to quit school to help out his parents. Siaboc lived in Manila with his uncle who introduced him to the band scene, however he was too young to work in a band and returned to Cebu. Siaboc pursued his dream and became the vocalist of Scrambled Eggs.

Career
He first appeared on television on Your Song and then won the role of Jeffrey in the prime time TV series  Pangarap na Bituin. He also starred in the action TV series entitled Palos portraying the role of Agent Enzo, together with Jake Cuenca.

He made quite a stir in the music scene leaving such memorable hits as "Hiling" and "May Tama Rin Ako" .

Personal life
Siaboc has one daughter with his current partner Trisha May Varga. On July 13, 2016, Siaboc, together with his cousins went to the police authorities in his hometown in Toledo, Cebu to clear his name in the station's watchlist due to allegations that he was involved in illegal drugs, as opposed to earlier reports of "surrendering". Siaboc admitted that he was previously using illegal drugs, but denied the claim that he is selling them or dealing with illegal drug transactions.

Filmography

Television

Awards and nominations

References

External links
 

Filipino male television actors
Filipino male film actors
Filipino male pop singers
21st-century Filipino male actors
21st-century Filipino male singers
People from Quezon City
Male actors from Cebu
1987 births
Living people
Filipino male voice actors
Pinoy Dream Academy participants
Star Magic